Tony Scott (1944–2012) was a British film director.

Tony or Anthony Scott may also refer to:

Entertainment
 Tony Scott (musician) (1921–2007), American jazz clarinetist
 Tony Scott (rapper) (born 1971), Dutch rapper
 A. O. Scott (born 1966), American film critic

Sports
 Tony Scott (baseball) (born 1951), American professional baseball player
 Tony Scott (footballer) (1941–2021), English professional footballer
 Tony Scott (American football) (born 1976), American footballer
 Anthony Scott (footballer) (born 1995), Australian rules footballer for the Western Bulldogs.

Other
 Tony Scott (physicist), Irish physicist and science communicator 
 Tony Scott, CIO of the US federal government